Patrick Joseph McCormick (December 10, 1880 – May 18, 1953) was the titular bishop of Atenia and auxiliary bishop of the Roman Catholic Archdiocese of Washington. He was the 7th rector of The Catholic University of America, and was the first alumnus to serve as rector.

Born in Norwich, Connecticut, McCormick was ordained a priest on July 26, 1904, for the Archdiocese of Hartford. He was named bishop on June 14, 1950, and was ordained as an Auxiliary Bishop of Washington, DC on September 21, 1950, at the National Shrine of the Immaculate Conception.

References

External links
 

Presidents of the Catholic University of America
1880 births
1953 deaths
Religious leaders from Norwich, Connecticut
Catholics from Connecticut
20th-century American Roman Catholic titular bishops
20th-century American academics